Cheng Sheng-teh (born 24 August 1941) is a Taiwanese weightlifter. He competed at the 1964 Summer Olympics and the 1968 Summer Olympics.

References

1941 births
Living people
Taiwanese male weightlifters
Olympic weightlifters of Taiwan
Weightlifters at the 1964 Summer Olympics
Weightlifters at the 1968 Summer Olympics
Place of birth missing (living people)
20th-century Taiwanese people